Sembilu is a 1994 Malaysian Malay-language romantic drama film directed by Yusof Haslam. The story concerns on a love story between a famous rock singer, Awie, with his lover Wati which is opposed by Wati's brother.

Synopsis
Wati, a lovely undergraduate was courting Awie, the famous rock star. They were childhood sweethearts with their parents' blessings. Their relationship was well accepted, except for one person, Azman who is Wati's brother. Azman, with a history of his wife, Maria leaving him for a singer, was against all artistes. Maria later died in a tragic accident and Azman was outraged. Ziana, a nightclub singer had fallen for Awie and tried to lure him. However, the relationship between Wati and Awie remained strong when Awie sang 'Di Ambang Wati' as a symbol of their love. On the other hand, Azman was still trying to break up the pair. When Awie was in misery, Ziana took advantage of seducing Awie. Awie finally fell for Ziana's lust. Knowing this, Wati felt that she was cheated and wanted to call it quits. Nevertheless, the fling between Awie and Ziana did not go far when he realised that his heart was still with Wati..

Cast
 Awie as Awie
 Erra Fazira as Wati 
 Ziana Zain as Ziana
 Mustapha Kamal as Azman
 Aida Rahim as Maria
 Noraini Hashim as Salmah 
 Alice Voon as Alice 
 Khairil Anwar as Joe
 Adik Khairullah as Hafiz

Reception
The film was released on 18 August 1994 and became a commercial success, being the highest-grossing film for the year with a gross of RM4.2 million ($1.8 million). Despite the film's box office success, it received negative reviews from critics.

Awards and nominations
12th Malaysian Film Festival, 1995
 Best Supporting Actor - Mustapha Kamal (Won)

References

External links
 Sembilu at Sinema Malaysia.
 

1994 romantic drama films
Malay-language films
Films directed by Yusof Haslam
Films with screenplays by Yusof Haslam
Skop Productions films
Films produced by Yusof Haslam
1994 drama films
1994 films
Malaysian romantic drama films